The Strange Case of Mrs. Hudson's Cat: And Other Science Mysteries Solved by Sherlock Holmes is a collection of Sherlock Holmes pastiche stories by Colin Bruce which attempts to teach scientific concepts via Holmesian mysteries. With Watson's assistance, Holmes solves cases involving elastic space-time and quantum theory. It has also been published as The Einstein Paradox.

Professor Challenger also appears in some of the stories.

A further book, Conned Again, Watson! Cautionary Tales of Logic, Math, and Probability, which is more mathematically oriented, was published in 2001.

Reception

References

1997 novels
Sherlock Holmes novels
Sherlock Holmes pastiches